Government Post Graduate Jahanzeb College is one of the pioneer institutes of higher education in Swat Valley, Khyber Pakhtunkhwa. It was founded by the ex-ruler of Swat State, in order to provide education to the populace of the region. It is in the Malakand division.

The college offers both arts and science learning opportunities to the students and affiliated with the University of Swat. The College has been built in the shape of "E".

Inception
His Highness, Miangul Abdul Haq Jahanzeb, the former ruler of Swat state, built a lot of schools in every corner of his domain, including the erection of the building of Jahanzeb College in 1952.

The buildings of Jahanzeb College can be seen in clusters sprawling on both sides of the road that links Mingora and Saidu Sharif.

Post Graduate Departments
 Deptt of: Computer Science
 Deptt of: Economics
 Deptt of: Botany
 Deptt of: Mathematics:
 Deptt of: Chemistry
 Deptt of: English
 Deptt of: Physics
 Deptt of: Urdu 
 Deptt of: Pakistan studies
 Deptt of: History
 Deptt of: Health and physical education
 Deptt of: Islamic studies
 Deptt of: statistics

Under Graduate Departments
 Deptt of: Computer Science
 Deptt of: Library Science
 Deptt of: Political Science
 Deptt of: Physical  Education
 Deptt of: Urdu
 Deptt of: History
 Deptt of: Geography
 Deptt of: Statistics
 Deptt of: Mathematics
 Deptt of: Zoology
 Deptt of: Pakistan Studies
 Deptt of; physics

Hostel facilities
The College has five hostels which are located in close proximity to the main building;
  Saidu Hostel: (1953)
Saidu Hostel has two storey building with a capacity of 120 boarders for intermediate section.

  Federal Hostel: (1973)

Federal Hostel has two Storey building with a capacity of 52 boarders for degree level and located in neighbourhood of Saidu Hostel.

  Girls Hostel: (2003).

Girls hostel has two storey building with Limited boarders capacity for Post Graduate level students.

  Mingora Hostel: (1956).

Mingora Hostel has three Storey building with a Capacity of 200 boarders for Postgraduate level students and situated near grassy ground.

 Bachelor’s Hostel: ( 1984).

Bachelor's Hostel has two Storey building and is reserve for teachers only.

Notable alumni
 Laiq Zada Laiq, Pakistani poet
 Shamim Shahid, Pakistani journalist

References

Public universities and colleges in Khyber Pakhtunkhwa
Educational institutions established in 1952
1952 establishments in Pakistan